Karl Malinsky Gibbs (born October 31, 1963) is an American politician. He is a member of the Mississippi House of Representatives from the 36th District, being first elected in 2013. He is a member of the Democratic party.

References

1969 births
Living people
Democratic Party members of the Mississippi House of Representatives
21st-century American politicians